John Philip Horton (born ) is a retired English rugby union player. Horton played 13 matches for England between 1978 and 1984, scoring 12 points. He played club rugby for Bath, making 380 appearances for the club between 1973 and 1985, and also played for Bristol.

References

1951 births
Living people
English rugby union players
Rugby union fly-halves
Bath Rugby players
Bristol Bears players
Lancashire County RFU players
Somerset County RFU players
England international rugby union players